Julian Austin (born August 24, 1963) is a Canadian country music singer. He has released more than fifteen singles in Canada, including the Number One hit "Little Ol' Kisses" (1997). In addition, Austin has recorded five studio albums.

Biography
Austin released his first album, What My Heart Already Knows, on May 6, 1997. The album was certified gold by the Canadian Recording Industry Association for sales of 50,000 copies, and the first single, "Little Ol' Kisses," went to No. 1 the Canadian country singles chart. That same year, Austin won the Wrangler Rising Star Award from the Canadian Country Music Association (CCMA). All of the additional singles released from the album reached the top 20, including the No. 3 song, "Diamond." In 1998, Austin was nominated for Best Country Male Vocalist at the Juno Awards, but lost to Paul Brandt.

He moved to Calgary, Alberta in 1998 to work on his second album. However, the project was put on hold when he was injured in a bull-riding accident on January 9, 1999. Austin was left with several broken and cracked ribs, a punctured right lung, and a gaping hole in his right leg. After his recovery, Back in Your Life was released on March 7, 2000. The album included a cover of the Steve Miller classic "Take the Money and Run," which reached No. 4 on the Canadian country singles chart. The album earned Austin six CCMA nominations, and he was again nominated for Best Country Male at the Juno's, once again losing to Paul Brandt.

Austin left his record label, ViK. Recordings, in 2001. The following year, he was approached by Civilian Records president Myles Goodwyn. His third album, Bulletproof, was released on August 13, 2002. Singles from the album didn't perform well on the charts, and Austin left the label due to creative differences.

He began work on his fourth album in 2005, The Red and White, which was released by LMG Records in 2007. His fifth studio album, One for One, was released be Little Ol' Records on May 26, 2009.

Personal life
Austin currently lives in Steinbach, Manitoba with his wife Angela and their dog, Baxter. Austin is an avid supporter of the Canadian Forces. He has done performances for the troops and has made a tribute song to raise money for the Sapper Mike McTeague Wounded Warriors fund, called "The Red and White Brigade".

Discography

Studio albums

Singles

1997–2000

2001–present

Music videos

Awards
Canadian Country Music Awards
Wrangler Rising Star Award (1997)

References

External links

CanadianBands.com entry
 
 

1963 births
Living people
People from Kings County, New Brunswick
Canadian country singer-songwriters
Canadian male singers
Musicians from New Brunswick
Canadian Country Music Association Rising Star Award winners
Canadian male singer-songwriters